Cleisostomopsis is a genus of flowering plants belonging to the family Orchidaceae.

Its native range is Indian Subcontinent to Southeastern China and Indo-China.

Species
The following species are recognized:

Cleisostomopsis eberhardtii 
Cleisostomopsis elytrigera 
Cleisostomopsis filiformis 
Cleisostomopsis roseus

References

Orchids
Orchid genera